Moorsel is a village in Flemish Brabant, Flanders, Belgium. Moorsel is a part of the municipality of Tervuren, alongside the villages of Duisburg, Tervuren and Vossem. It is located 14 km from Brussels and 14 km from Leuven.

Populated places in Flemish Brabant
Tervuren
Belgium geography articles needing translation from French Wikipedia